PESI may refer to:
 Pan-European Species directories Infrastructure
 Pulmonary Embolism Severity Index